Krige Schabort (born 9 September 1963) is a paralympic athlete from South Africa competing mainly in category T54 distance events. He started to represent the US after 2012.

Biography
Krige competed in the 1500m, 5000m, 10000m and marathon at the 2000 Summer Paralympics winning the silver medal in the T54 marathon.  This was a feat he could not match in 2004 when competing in the 5000m, 10000m and marathon he failed to medal. He moved to America in 2012 and now represents United States at the Paralympics.

Schabort is a five-time Falmouth Road Race champion in the wheelchair division, winning most recently on August 12, 2012, with a time of 23 minutes, 53 seconds. He also won the Falmouth Mile race the night before, with a time of 3:20.

He lost his legs in 1987 during the South African Border War.

References

1963 births
Living people
South African male triathletes
Paralympic athletes of South Africa
Paralympic silver medalists for South Africa
Athletes (track and field) at the 2000 Summer Paralympics
Athletes (track and field) at the 2012 Summer Paralympics
Paratriathletes at the 2016 Summer Paralympics
Medalists at the 2000 Summer Paralympics
South African military personnel of the Border War
Paralympic medalists in athletics (track and field)
20th-century South African people
21st-century South African people